"Mind Blowin'" is the lead single from Smooth's eponymous third album.

Track listing
 "Mind Blowin'" (LP Version)- 4:16  
 "Mind Blowin'" (Kenny 'Smoove' Illmatic Mix)- 4:26  
 "Mind Blowin'" (Mr. Lee's Radio Chant)- 4:30  
 "Mind Blowin'" (Radio / Video Version)- 3:56  
 "Mind Blowin'" (Kenny 'Smoove' Laid Back Mix)- 4:00  
 "Ghetto Style" (LP Version)- 4:32

Charts

1995 singles
Jive Records singles
Smooth (singer) songs
Songs written by Smooth (singer)